Staircase is the fourth solo piano album released on ECM by jazz pianist Keith Jarrett. It features Jarrett performing four solo piano "suites" recorded in the studio in May 1976.

Jarrett and producer Manfred Eicher had arrived at Studio Davout in Paris to record a soundtrack to Michèle Rosier's film Mon cœur est rouge (Paint My Heart Red).  Finishing early with several hours of studio time left and impressed by the quality of the studio's piano, they spontaneously decided to record this album.

Reception 

The Allmusic review by Richard S. Ginell awarded the album 4 stars, stating, "One can always admire Jarrett's lovely tone and flexible touch, yet when he gets stuck for ideas, the repetitions finally begin to grate. Maybe he really needs the stimulus of a live audience in order to get the creative and rhythmic juices flowing when flying solo.".

Jarrett biographer Wolfgang Sandner called the album "an impressive study in sound," and an "unbelievable synthesis of sonic art," and commented: "There is no other Keith Jarrett recording that comes so close to achieving the pianistic ideal of lyricism as does this astounding album."

Track listing 
All compositions by Keith Jarrett

Staircase:
 "Part 1" - 6:57  
 "Part 2" - 7:58  
 "Part 3" - 1:25

Hourglass:
 "Part 1" - 4:42  
 "Part 2" - 14:03

Sundial:
 "Part 1" - 8:57  
 "Part 2" - 4:55  
 "Part 3" - 6:27

Sand:
 "Part 1" - 6:54  
 "Part 2" - 8:48  
 "Part 3" - 3:21

Personnel 
 Keith Jarrett – piano

Production
 Manfred Eicher - producer
 Roger Roche - engineer (recording)
 Barbara Wojirsch - cover design and layout
 Franco Fontana/IKS s.p.a., Modena - photography

References 

ECM Records albums
1976 albums
Keith Jarrett albums
Albums produced by Manfred Eicher
Instrumental albums
Solo piano jazz albums